Manometry refers to pressure measurement (usually in a medical context), taking forms including:

  Esophageal manometry, or Esophageal motility study
 Anorectal manometry
 Rhinomanometry